The Government Car Service (GCS) is a British organisation that provide safe car service for Ministers of HM Government. GCS was formerly part of the Government Car and Despatch Agency (GCDA). This was an executive agency of the Department for Transport, responsible for providing logistics services to the United Kingdom government and wider public sector.

History 
The agency was formed in 1997, when Security Facilities Executive was reformed.

The GCDA closed on Sunday 30 September 2012 following discontinuation of its despatch services earlier in the year. All government car services were closed as of that date, with the exception of secure transport for ministers, the Leader of the Opposition, former prime ministers and other senior officials, which transferred to the Department for Transport together with the supporting workshop services.

GCDA was split into two businesses: Government Car Service and Government Mail. The Government Car Service provides secure cars and drivers to government ministers and ran other people-movement services for the wider public sector. Government Mail (formerly known as the Interdespatch Service) provided inter-departmental mail and package movements, and a secure courier service for the wider public sector.

The Government Car Service is responsible for the Prime Ministerial Car, which is stored and maintained at 10 Downing Street, and staffed by the Metropolitan Police.

References

Sources

External links
 Official website

2012 disestablishments in the United Kingdom
Defunct executive agencies of the United Kingdom government
Department for Transport
Logistics in the United Kingdom